Kathleen Fraser (March 22, 1935 - February 5, 2019) was a contemporary poet. She was a Guggenheim Fellow.

Early years
Fraser was born in 1935 and grew up in Oklahoma, Colorado, and California.
She graduated from Occidental College.

Career 
During her teaching career at San Francisco State University from 1972 to 1992, she directed The Poetry Center and founded The American Poetry Archives; she also wrote and narrated the one-hour video Women Working in Literature.

Fraser was co-founder and co-editor, with Beverly Dahlen and Frances Jaffer, later joined by Susan Gevirtz, of the feminist poetics newsletter (HOW)ever. From 1983-1991, Fraser published and edited HOW(ever) as "a journal focused on innovative writing by contemporary women and neglected texts by American modernist women writers".

She died  February 5, 2019, in Emeryville, California.

Works
What I Want New York Harper & Row, 1974. , .
 Magritte Series Willits, Calif. : Tuumba Press, 1977. 
 New Shoes New York ; Hagerstown ; San Francisco ; London : Harper and Row, 1978. , 
Each Next, narratives, Berkeley : Figures, 1980. , 
 Something (even human voices) in the foreground, a lake (1984), 
Notes Preceding Trust Santa Monica: Lapis Press, 1987. , 
 When New Time Folds Up Minneapolis : Chax Press, 1993. , 
WING Mill Valley, CA Em Press 1995. , 
il cuore : the heart - New & Selected Poems (1970-1995) 	Wesleyan University Press; University Press of New England, 1997. ,  
Discreet Categories Forced Into Coupling Berkeley, Calif : Apogee Press, 2004. , 
"The cars" (2004) 
Movable Tyype Nightboat Books, 2011. ,

References

External links

 Book review
 A web guide to Kathleen Fraser from literaryhistory.com
The Magritte Series
 HOW(ever) archives
 Four Young Poets in 1959
How2 archives
Author page at the Electronic Poetry Center
An Entirely Different Immersion: Talking to Kathleen Fraser, LA Review of Books, Andy Fitch, 12/08/2017
Kathleen Fraser Papers MSS 529. Special Collections & Archives, UC San Diego Library.

1935 births
2019 deaths
Iowa Writers' Workshop faculty
Writers from Tulsa, Oklahoma
San Francisco State University faculty
American women poets
Poets from Oklahoma
20th-century American poets
21st-century American poets
20th-century American women writers
21st-century American women writers